Alvin Harris Gentry (born November 5, 1954) is an American professional basketball executive for the Sacramento Kings of the National Basketball Association (NBA). A former college basketball player, Gentry has led six different NBA teams. He served as an interim head coach for the Miami Heat at the end of the 1994–95 season, and later coached the Detroit Pistons, Los Angeles Clippers, Phoenix Suns, New Orleans Pelicans and Kings. He currently serves as the vice president of basketball engagement for the Kings.

Early and personal life
Gentry was born in Shelby, North Carolina, where he grew up and attended Shelby High School. His first cousin is former NC State and NBA star David Thompson.

Gentry played college basketball at Appalachian State University, where he was a point guard under Press Maravich and Bobby Cremins. In 1978 he spent one year as a graduate assistant at the University of Colorado. After one year working in private business, he returned to the bench when he received his first full-time collegiate assistant coaching job at Baylor University under Jim Haller in 1980. After one year at Baylor, Gentry returned to the University of Colorado as an assistant coach from 1981–1986 under Tom Apke. From 1986–1989, Gentry served as an assistant at the University of Kansas under Larry Brown, where they won the 1988 NCAA National Championship.

Gentry has been married twice and is the father of two sons and one daughter.

Coaching career

Early career
In 1989, Gentry began his NBA coaching career as an assistant coach for the San Antonio Spurs under Larry Brown.

Gentry joined Gregg Popovich, R. C. Buford, and Ed Manning as part of Larry Brown's assistant coaching staff for the Spurs when Brown left Kansas before the 1988–89 NBA season. After two seasons in San Antonio, Gentry left to become an assistant for the Los Angeles Clippers beginning in the 1990–91 season.

Miami Heat and Detroit Pistons
For the 1991 season Gentry joined Kevin Loughery's staff as an assistant coach for the Miami Heat, where he coached for three seasons. He then moved to Detroit following the 1994–95 season where he served as an assistant for two and a half seasons before being named head coach late in the 1997–98 season.

LA Clippers
Gentry returned to San Antonio as head assistant coach following the 1999–2000 season, where he was reunited with former co-assistants Gregg Popovich (the Spurs head coach and vice president of basketball operations) and R .C. Buford (the Spurs' general manager). But that assignment was brief, as Gentry accepted the head coaching position for the Los Angeles Clippers weeks after taking the San Antonio job. He led the Clippers to 31 wins and 39 wins respectively in his first two seasons as their head coach. Those seasons were marked by the solid play of young players, such as Darius Miles, Elton Brand and Lamar Odom. In Gentry's third season, however, the team regressed (despite the addition of Andre Miller), and Gentry was fired in March 2003, following a run of five consecutive defeats. His final record as Clippers head coach stood at 89–133.

Phoenix Suns

Gentry later became an assistant coach for the Phoenix Suns for six years, serving under head coaches Mike D'Antoni and Terry Porter. When Porter was fired in his first season as head coach, Alvin Gentry took over on an interim basis. He was named Suns' head coach for the 2009–10 season. Gentry's record in his first year as head coach during the 2009–2010 season was 54 wins, a career high, against 28 losses. The Suns advanced to the Western Conference Finals and lost to the Lakers in six games. He became the fifth head coach to lead the Suns to the Western Conference Finals in his first full season. Gentry figured out how to blend the two styles of D'Antoni and Porter. Comparing his coaching to D'Antoni, Gentry said "We are not seven seconds or less. We're 12 seconds or under. We don't take a lot of really quick shots. We don't play with that breakneck pace. We play with a rhythm." Spurs head coach Gregg Popovich remarked "One thing about Phoenix is they are better defensively than in the past. They're much more active, much more committed, they've taken responsibility to a much more significant degree than ever before."

On January 18, 2013, Gentry mutually parted ways with the Phoenix Suns. In July 2013, he returned to the Clippers organization, taking the title of associate head coach, making him Doc Rivers' lead assistant.

Golden State Warriors
After one season with the Clippers, Gentry signed a three-year contract as associate head coach for the Golden State Warriors, working under new head coach Steve Kerr.

New Orleans Pelicans
On May 18, 2015, the New Orleans Pelicans were granted permission by the Warriors to interview Gentry for their head coaching vacancy. He signed with the Pelicans on May 30, prior to the start of the 2015 NBA Finals, but was to remain with Golden State until the series was completed.
The Warriors won the NBA Championship after they defeated the Cleveland Cavaliers in six games to give Gentry his first NBA championship.

On August 15, 2020, after a disappointing performance in the NBA Bubble following the resumption of the 2019–20 season, Gentry was fired as the Pelicans' coach. He was 175–225 in five seasons. Often plagued by injuries, New Orleans used 140 starting lineups in that span, 11 more than the next-closest team in the league. Gentry left the Pelicans with the second-most wins in franchise history behind Byron Scott and was their only coach with a winning post-season record (5–4).

Sacramento Kings
On October 6, 2020, Gentry was named the associate head coach of the Sacramento Kings. On November 21, 2021, Gentry was named the interim head coach of the Kings following the dismissal of Luke Walton. On April 11, 2022, he was fired by the Kings.

Executive career
Following his dismissal as head coach, Gentry was retained by the Sacramento Kings as the vice president of basketball engagement.

Head coaching record

|-
| style="text-align:left;"|Miami
| style="text-align:left;"|
| 36||15||21|||| style="text-align:center;"|4th in Atlantic||—||—||—||—
| style="text-align:center;"|Missed playoffs
|-
| style="text-align:left;"|Detroit
| style="text-align:left;"|
| 37||16||21|||| style="text-align:center;"|6th in Central||—||—||—||—
| style="text-align:center;"|Missed playoffs
|-
| style="text-align:left;"|Detroit
| style="text-align:left;"|
| 50||29||21|||| style="text-align:center;"|3rd in Central||5||2||3||
| style="text-align:center;"|Lost in First Round
|-
| style="text-align:left;"|Detroit
| style="text-align:left;"|
| 58||28||30|||| style="text-align:center;"|(fired)||—||—||—||—
| style="text-align:center;"|—
|-
| style="text-align:left;"|L.A. Clippers
| style="text-align:left;"|
| 82||31||51|||| style="text-align:center;"|6th in Pacific||—||—||—||—
| style="text-align:center;"|Missed playoffs
|-
| style="text-align:left;"|L.A. Clippers
| style="text-align:left;"|
| 82||39||43|||| style="text-align:center;"|5th in Pacific||—||—||—||—
| style="text-align:center;"|Missed playoffs
|-
| style="text-align:left;"|L.A. Clippers
| style="text-align:left;"|
| 58||19||39|||| style="text-align:center;"|(fired)||—||—||—||—
| style="text-align:center;"|—
|-
| style="text-align:left;"|Phoenix
| style="text-align:left;"|
| 31||18||13|||| style="text-align:center;"|2nd in Pacific||—||—||—||—
| style="text-align:center;"|Missed playoffs
|-
| style="text-align:left;"|Phoenix
| style="text-align:left;"|
| 82||54||28|||| style="text-align:center;"|2nd in Pacific||16||10||6||
| style="text-align:center;"|Lost in Conference Finals
|-
| style="text-align:left;"|Phoenix
| style="text-align:left;"|
| 82||40||42|||| style="text-align:center;"|2nd in Pacific||—||—||—||—
| style="text-align:center;"|Missed playoffs
|-
| style="text-align:left;"|Phoenix
| style="text-align:left;"|
| 66||33||33|||| style="text-align:center;"|3rd in Pacific||—||—||—||—
| style="text-align:center;"|Missed playoffs
|-
| style="text-align:left;"|Phoenix
| style="text-align:left;"|
| 41||13||28|||| style="text-align:center;"|(fired)||—||—||—||—
| style="text-align:center;"|—
|-
| style="text-align:left;"|New Orleans
| style="text-align:left;"|
| 82||30||52|||| style="text-align:center;"|5th in Southwest||—||—||—||—
| style="text-align:center;"|Missed playoffs
|-
| style="text-align:left;"|New Orleans
| style="text-align:left;"|
| 82||34||48|||| style="text-align:center;"|4th in Southwest||—||—||—||—
| style="text-align:center;"|Missed playoffs
|-
| style="text-align:left;"|New Orleans
| style="text-align:left;"|
| 82||48||34|||| style="text-align:center;"|2nd in Southwest||9||5||4||
| style="text-align:center;"|Lost in Conference Semifinals
|-
| style="text-align:left;"|New Orleans
| style="text-align:left;"|
| 82||33||49|||| style="text-align:center;"|4th in Southwest||—||—||—||—
| style="text-align:center;"|Missed playoffs
|-
| style="text-align:left;"|New Orleans
| style="text-align:left;"|
| 72||30||42|||| style="text-align:center;"|5th in Southwest||—||—||—||—
| style="text-align:center;"|Missed playoffs
|-
| style="text-align:left;"|Sacramento
| style="text-align:left;"|
| 65||24||41|||| style="text-align:center;"|5th in Pacific||—||—||—||—
| style="text-align:center;"|Missed playoffs
|- class="sortbottom"
| style="text-align:center;" colspan="2"|Career ||1,170||534||636|||| ||30||17||13||||

References

External links

 NBA profile
 BasketballReference.com: Alvin Gentry

1954 births
Living people
20th-century African-American sportspeople
21st-century African-American people
African-American basketball coaches
African-American basketball players
American men's basketball coaches
American men's basketball players
Appalachian State Mountaineers men's basketball players
Basketball coaches from North Carolina
Basketball players from North Carolina
Baylor Bears men's basketball coaches
Colorado Buffaloes men's basketball coaches
Detroit Pistons assistant coaches
Detroit Pistons head coaches
Golden State Warriors assistant coaches
Kansas Jayhawks men's basketball coaches
Los Angeles Clippers assistant coaches
Los Angeles Clippers head coaches
Miami Heat assistant coaches
Miami Heat head coaches
New Orleans Hornets assistant coaches
New Orleans Pelicans head coaches
People from Shelby, North Carolina
Phoenix Suns assistant coaches
Phoenix Suns head coaches
Point guards
Sacramento Kings assistant coaches
Sacramento Kings head coaches
San Antonio Spurs assistant coaches